is a private university in Kirishima, Kagoshima, Japan. The predecessor of the school was founded in 1955, and eventually it adopted the present name in 1985.

External links
  

Educational institutions established in 1955
Private universities and colleges in Japan
Universities and colleges in Kagoshima Prefecture
Engineering universities and colleges in Japan
1955 establishments in Japan